Abū Zayd ibn Muḥammad ibn Abī Zayd commonly referred to as Abu Zayd or Abu Zayd al-Kashani ("Abu Zayd from Kashan"), was a Medieval Persian potter, who was most active between c. 1186 — 1219. He came from Kashan, which was a city in the northern part of Isfahan in Iran, first under the Seljuq Empire, then from 1194 under the Khwarizmian Empire. As such, his works represented the Turco-Persian  culture of the time. As a very aggressive potter, who was highly skilled, he was able to work on 15 or more masterpieces, and his collection is larger than that of any other medieval Iranian potter. The collection includes both luxury items and artifacts at the time, and other artistic items: lustreware and mina'i ware.  He also wrote poetry, some of which was inscribed on his pottery.

Signed and dated works

References

Further reading
"A Brief Biography of Abu Zayd" by Sheila Blair, Frontiers of Islamic Art and Architecture: Essays in Celebration of Oleg Grabar's Eightieth Birthday,  Volume 25 of Muqarnas : an annual on Islamic art and architecture, 2008, BRILL, eds. Gülru Neci̇poğlu, Julia Bailey, 9789004173279  
Canby, Sheila, pp. 114–115, in Freestone, Ian, Gaimster, David R. M. (eds), Pottery in the Making: World Ceramic Traditions, 1997, British Museum Publications,

External links 
 Iranica article
 Entry for Abu Zayd on the Union List of Artist Names
 Bowl by Abu Zayd in the collection of the British Museum

Iranian potters
People from Kashan
12th-century Iranian people
13th-century Iranian people
Year of birth uncertain
Year of death uncertain